Central chemoreceptors of the central nervous system, located on the ventrolateral medullary surface in the vicinity of the exit of the 9th and 10th cranial nerves, are sensitive to the pH of their environment.

These act to detect the changes in pH of nearby cerebrospinal fluid (CSF) that are indicative of altered oxygen or carbon dioxide concentrations available to brain tissues. An increase in carbon dioxide causes tension of the arteries, often resulting from decreased CO2 output (hypercapnia), indirectly causes the blood to become more acidic; the cerebrospinal fluid pH is closely comparable to plasma, as carbon dioxide easily diffuses across the blood–brain barrier.

Only CO2 levels affect this as it can diffuse across, reacting with H2O to form carbonic acid and thus decrease pH. Central chemoreception remains, in this way, distinct from peripheral chemoreceptors.

The central chemoreception system has also been shown experimentally to respond to hypercapnic hypoxia (elevated CO2, decreased O2) and aqueous sodium cyanide injection into the whole animal and in vitro slice preparation. These methods can be used to mimic some forms of hypoxic hypoxia and they are currently being studied including the detection of variation in arterial CO2 tension acting as a quick-response-system for short term (or emergency) regulation.

This system utilizes a negative feedback system, therefore if the pH of the cerebral spinal fluid does not compare to an ideal “set” level, then the receptor will send an error signal to the effectors and appropriate action may be executed.

Peripheral chemoreceptors (carotid and aortic bodies) and central chemoreceptors (medullary neurons) primarily function to regulate respiratory activity.  This is an important mechanism for maintaining arterial blood pO2, pCO2, and pH within appropriate physiological ranges. For example, a fall in arterial pO2 (hypoxemia) or an increase in arterial pCO2 (hypercapnia) leads to an increase in the rate and depth of respiration through activation of the chemoreceptor reflex. Chemoreceptor activity, however, also affects cardiovascular function either directly (by interacting with medullary vasomotor centers) or indirectly (via altered pulmonary stretch receptor activity). Respiratory arrest and circulatory shock (these conditions decrease arterial pO2 and pH, and increase arterial pCO2) dramatically increase chemoreceptor activity leading to enhanced sympathetic outflow to the heart and vasculature via activation of the vasomotor center in the medulla.

See also 
Chemoreceptors
Vasomotor center

References

External links 
 
 Overview at cvphysiology.com

Sensory receptors
Respiratory physiology